In mathematics, particularly in the area of Fourier analysis, the Titchmarsh theorem may refer to:

 The Titchmarsh convolution theorem
 The theorem relating real and imaginary parts of the boundary values of a Hp function in the upper half-plane with the Hilbert transform of an Lp function.  See Hilbert transform#Titchmarsh's theorem.